Purgatory is Chicago Celtic punk band The Tossers fourth studio album.  It was released in 2003 on Thick Records and was their last album with the label.

Track listing
 "With the North Wind/Here We Go Again"  – 3:46
 "The Ballad of the Thoughtful Rover"  – 3:52
 "Nantucket Girls Song"  – 3:29
 "Come Dancing"  – 2:13
 "Caoin (Lament)"  – 3:34
 "The Squall"  – 4:25
 "Chicago"  – 6:51
 "Monday Morning"  – 3:37
 "First League Out from Land"  – 3:23
 "Minutes on a Screen"  – 5:38
 "Purgatory"  – 5:14
 "Time to Go"  – 4:08
 "Memory"  – 4:11
 "Faraway"  – 5:24
 "Ni Thabharfaidh Siad Pingin Duit"  – 0:57
 "Going Away" – 8:07
 The song "Going Away" ends at 3:52. After 1 minute of silence, at 4:52 begins the hidden song "The Parting Glass".

The Tossers albums
2003 albums
Thick Records albums